Gustav Wunderwald (1 January 1882 – 24 June 1945) was a German painter of the New Objectivity style, and a theatrical set designer.

Career 
The son of the gunsmith Karl Wunderwald and his wife Adelheid née Hirtz, Gustav Wunderwald was born in Kalk, Cologne in 1882. Beginning his artistic career in 1896, Wunderwald began as an apprentice of the Cologne master painter Wilhelm Kuhn. In 1899 he became a scenery painter under Professor Max Bruckner, and from 1900 to 1904 he worked at G. Hartwig's studio for stage painting in Charlottenburg. From 1904 to 1907 he worked as a set designer at the Royal Opera in Stockholm. Then he joined the Drama and Music Executive Board of the Theatre in Düsseldorf under Louise Dumont and Gustav Lindemann. It was here that he also had the first exhibition of his art, and he met his longtime friend, the Rhenish writer and playwright Wilhelm Schmidtbonn (1876–1952). In May 1908 he married Amalie Minna Gerull (1881–1941). With her and the Schmidtbonns he spent the years 1908 to 1909 in Tegernsee.

After leaving his position in Düsseldorf, which had earned him recognition from renowned theatre critics, he decided to live and work for a year "in nature", as an experiment. But in 1909 he returned to conventional employment, when he worked briefly as a member of the technical staff at the Stadttheater Innsbruck. In 1910 he moved to Freiburg, where he held the position of the Chief Stage Painter at the Municipal Theatre until 1911 . He held an exhibition in the Kunstverein Freiburg in March 1911. In 1912 Wunderwald made the longed-for career move to Berlin: He worked as a decorative painter at the Deutsche Oper Berlin in Charlottenburg until 1915, when he was called up. During World War I he was posted to the Macedonian front.

Up to the war, in addition to his stage scenery work, Wunderwald created realistic paintings and drawings of the Rhineland, Tyrol, the Black Forest, Havel and East Prussian landscapes. He also did figure paintings of his wife, family members and fellow soldiers. In 1918 Wunderwald realized his lifelong dream; from that time until his death in 1945 Wunderwald worked as a freelance artist in Charlottenburg. In 1924 the Berlin Art and Landsberg bookshop displayed 20 of his works in his first comprehensive solo exhibition.  In 1925 and 1926, Wunderwald was represented at the Great Berlin Art Exhibition, and from 1927 in numerous national exhibitions. His works dealt with industrial landscapes in the Berlin districts of Moabit and Wedding, street canyons of Prenzlauer Berg, tenements, houses and back-to-backs in Spandau. He painted bridges, subways, train stations, billboards, as well as villas in Charlottenburg. Rural subjects included villages in the immediate vicinity of Berlin, Havel, Spree and East Prussia landscapes. People were reduced to the role of anonymous figures seen from behind.

Of this period of his creativity he wrote: "The saddest things hit me in the stomach. Moabit and Wedding grab me most with their sombreness and desolation" (1926). In 1927 on the occasion of the group exhibition "The face of Berlin 1926" at the Neumann & Nierendorf gallery, the art critic Paul Westheim (1886–1963) devoted a monographic essay to Wunderwald  in the January issue of the Art Journal which he edited, in which he described Wunderwald as "the Berlin Utrillo" a label that Wunderwald felt flattered him.

The final Wunderwald exhibition before the Second World War took place at the 1934 Great Berlin Art Exhibition. In the Nazi era, his works were disparaged by the authorities and from 1934 he was not allowed to exhibit or sell work. During this period he made a living tinting advertising films for Ufa and Mars Film, and looked after his wife, a seamstress. After her death, Wunderwald married Bertha Ludwig in 1941. However he himself died on 24 June 1945 in Berlin, as a result of hyponatremia (water poisoning).

The rediscovery of Wunderwald after the Second World War was the work of Berlin art chief officer Friedrich Lambart with the 1950 retrospective "Images of Berlin" in the Zoo in the gardens of the town hall. It was followed by solo exhibitions in Berlin (house Lützowplatz, 1962, and Bassenge Gallery, 1971–72), Munich (Gallery Gunzenhauser, 1972) and from 1965 as a result of the growing interest in the art of New Objectivity participation in numerous national and international group exhibitions. The most comprehensive solo exhibition took place at Berlin Gallery in 1982, followed by the Städtische Galerie, Albstadt in 1982/83 on the occasion of the 100th birthday of the painter.

Wunderwald's oeuvre comprises some 180 paintings, which are today located primarily in German private ownership or in the possession of the following museums: Berlin Gallery, Berlin; New National Gallery, Berlin; Berlin City Museum; City Museum, Bonn; Hessian State Museum, Darmstadt; the Theatre Studies Collection at the University of Cologne; Art Forum East German Gallery, Regensburg.

References 
 Wilhelm Schmidt Bonn: The right to the name, in: The stage, April 8, 1909
 Oskar Maurus Fontana: Gustav Wunderwald, in: The flag, 1st year, No. 16, 1910.
 Paul West home: Gustav Wunderwald in. The Art Journal, 11 year, No. 1, 1927
 Fritz Burger: Introduction to Modern Art, Potsdam 1928
 Felix Dargel: Berlin without makeup, in:. Dispatch, July 25, 1950 No. 89th
 Wilhelm Schmidt Bonn: Gustav Wunderwald, in: Kurt Loup (ed.), The festive home. The Düsseldorf Schauspielhaus Dumont-Lindemann. Mirror and expression of the time, Cologne / Bonn 1955
 Elisabeth Erdmann-Macke: memoir of August Macke, Stuttgart 1962
 Wieland Schmied: New Objectivity and Magic Realism in Germany 1918–1933, Hanover 1969
 Wunderwald Calendar 1982 ed. Information from the centering area of Berlin, Berlin 1981 Texts: Hildegard Reinhardt and Eberhard Roters.

1882 births
1945 deaths